The Toronto Rock are a lacrosse team based in Toronto playing in the National Lacrosse League (NLL). The 2011 season was the 15th in franchise history, and 14th as the Rock. The Rock won the championship on May 15 defeating the Washington Stealth 8-7. They tied the NLL record with their 6th victory.

Regular season

Conference standings

Game log
Reference:

Playoffs

Game log
Reference:

Roster

See also
2011 NLL season

References

Toronto
2011 in Toronto
2011 in Canadian sports